Kim Clijsters and Ai Sugiyama were the defending champions, but Clijsters withdrew from the tournament due to a left ankle injury. Sugiyama teamed up with Liezel Huber and lost in the quarterfinals to Dinara Safina and Meghann Shaughnessy.

Cara Black and Rennae Stubbs won the title by defeating Dinara Safina and Meghann Shaughnessy 7–5, 3–6, 6–4 in the final.

Seeds

Draw

Draw

References
 Official results archive (ITF)
 Official results archive (WTA)

Women's Doubles
Doubles